"We've Got a Good Fire Goin'" is a song written by Dave Loggins, and recorded by American country music artist Don Williams.  It was released in January 1986 as the first single from the album New Moves.  The song reached number 3 on the Billboard Hot Country Singles & Tracks chart.

Chart performance

References

1986 singles
Don Williams songs
Songs written by Dave Loggins
Song recordings produced by Garth Fundis
Capitol Records Nashville singles
1986 songs